The 2017 Minnesota Twins season  was the 57th season for the franchise in the Twin Cities of Minnesota, their eighth season at Target Field and the 117th overall in the American League. The Twins began the season on April 3 at home against the Kansas City Royals and finished the year on October 1 at home against the Detroit Tigers. 

On September 27, the Twins clinched the second wild-card berth to become the first team in Major League Baseball history to reach the postseason after losing 100 games the previous season. They were able to take advantage of a weak American League, as they made the playoffs despite their pedestrian 85-77 record, the worst record to make the playoffs since the 2008 Los Angeles Dodgers. They lost to the New York Yankees in the Wild Card Game.

Offseason and spring training
The Twins recorded a 16–13 win–loss record in spring training. Three games finished tied and were therefore not included in the standings.

Regular season

Season standings

Record vs. opponents

Game log

|- style=background:#cfc
| 1 || April 3 || Royals || 7–1 || Santana (1–0) || Strahm (0–1) || — || 39,615 || 1–0 || W1 
|- style=background:#cfc
| 2 || April 5 || Royals || 9–1 ||  Santiago (1–0)  || Kennedy (0–1) || — || 15,171 || 2–0 || W2 
|- style=background:#cfc
| 3 || April 6 || Royals || 5–3 || Rogers (1–0) || Minor (0–1) || Kintzler (1) || 16,078 || 3–0 || W3
|- style=background:#cfc
| 4 || April 7 || @ White Sox || 3–1 || Hughes (1–0) || Holland (0–1) || Kintzler (2) || 14,004 || 4–0 || W4 
|- style=background:#fbb
| 5 || April 8 || @ White Sox || 2–6 || Gonzalez (1–0) || Mejia (0–1) || — || 23,024 || 4–1 || L1 
|- style=background:#cfc
| 6 || April 9 || @ White Sox || 4–1 || Santana (2–0) || Quintana (0–2) || Kintzler (3) || 24,074 || 5–1 || W1
|- style=background:#fbb
| 7 || April 11 || @ Tigers || 1–2 || Boyd (1–1) || Santiago (1–1) || Rodríguez (3) || 21,237 || 5–2 || L1
|- style=background:#fbb
| 8 || April 12 || @ Tigers || 3–5 || Fulmer (1–0) || Gibson (0–1)  || Wilson (1)|| 23,738 || 5–3 || L2
|- style=background:#cfc
| 9 || April 13 || @ Tigers  || 11–5 || Hughes (2–0) || Zimmermann (1–1) || Haley (1) || 22,573 || 6–3 || W1
|- style=background:#fbb
| 10 || April 14 || White Sox || 1–2  || Jennings (1–0) || Pressly (0–1) || Robertson (2) || 18,466 || 6–4 || L1
|- style=background:#cfc 
| 11 || April 15 || White Sox || 6–0  || Santana (3–0) || Quintana (0–3) || — || 25,938 || 7–4  || W1
|- style=background:#fbb
| 12 || April 16 || White Sox || 1–3  ||  Jones (1–0) || Pressly (0–2) ||  Robertson (3) || 19,511 || 7–5  || L1
|- style=background:#fbb
| 13 || April 17 || Indians || 1–3 || Salazar (1–1) || Gibson (0–2) || Allen (3) || 16,961 || 7–6 || L2
|- style=background:#fbb
| 14 || April 18 || Indians || 4–11 || Tomlin (1–2) || Hughes (2–1) || — || 16,553 || 7–7 || L3
|- style=background:#bbb
| —|| April 19 || Indians || colspan="7" |Postponed (rain) (Rescheduled for June 17) 
|- style=background:#fbb
| 15 || April 20 || Indians || 2–6 || Bauer (1–2) || Duffey (0–1) || — || 17,339 || 7–8 || L4 
|- style=background:#cfc
| 16 || April 21 || Tigers || 6–3 || Santiago (2–1) || Verlander (1–2) || Kintzler (4) || 22,647 || 8–8|| W1
|- style=background:#fbb
| 17 || April 22 || Tigers || 4–5 || Hardy (1–0) || Tonkin (0–1) || Rodríguez (6) || 25,719 || 8–9 || L1
|- style=background:#fbb
| 18 || April 23 || Tigers || 4–13 || Fulmer (2–1) || Gibson (0–3) || — || 26,713 || 8–10 || L2
|- style=background:#cfc
| 19 || April 24 || @ Rangers || 3–2 || Hughes (3–1) || Perez (1–3) || Kintzler (5) || 19,027 || 9–10 || W1
|- style=background:#cfc
| 20 || April 25 || @ Rangers || 8–1 || Santana (4–0) || Cashner (0–2) || — || 20,568 || 10–10 || W2
|- style=background:#fbb 
| 21 || April 26 || @ Rangers || 3–14 || Hamels (2–0) || Rogers (1–1) || — || 22,365 || 10–11 || L1
|- style= background:#cfc
| 22 || April 28 || @ Royals || 6–4 || Breslow (1–0) || Soria (1–1) || Kintzler (6) || 27,911 || 11–11 || W1
|- style= background:#bbb
| — || April 29 || @ Royals ||colspan="7"|Postponed (rain) (Rescheduled for July 1)
|- style= background:#cfc
| 23 || April 30 || @ Royals || 7–5 || Hughes (4–1) || Hammel (0–3) || Kintzler (7) || 32,685 || 12–11 || W2
|-

|- style= background:#cfc
| 24 || May 2 || A's || 9–1 || Santana (5–0) || Gray (0–1) || — || 18,930 || 13–11 || W3 
|- style= background:#cfc
| 25 || May 3 || A's || 7–4 || Santiago (3–1) || Graveman (2–2) || — || 18,658 || 14–11 || W4
|- style= background:#fbb
| 26 || May 4 || A's || 5–8 || Cotton (3–3) || Gibson (0–4)  || Casilla (5) || 19,247 || 14–12  || L1 
|- style= background:#cfc
| 27 || May 5 || Red Sox || 5–4 || Kintzler (1–0) || Barnes (3–1) ||  || 28,707 || 15–12 || W1
|- style= background:#fbb
| 28 || May 6 || Red Sox || 1–11 || Porcello (2–4) ||  Tepesch (0–1) ||  || 30,859 || 15–13 || L1
|- style= background:#fbb
| 29 || May 7 || Red Sox || 6–17 || Sale (3–2) || Santana (5–1) || — || 31,763 || 15–14 || L2  
|- style= background:#cfc
| 30 || May 9 || @ White Sox || 7–2 || Santiago (4–1) || Pelfrey (0–3) || — || 14,498 || 16–14 || W1
|- style= background:#bbb
| — || May 10 || @ White Sox || colspan="7" |Postponed (rain) (Rescheduled August 21)
|- style= background:#cfc
| 31 || May 11 || @ White Sox || 7–6 || Pressly (1–2) || Holland (3–3) || Kintzler (8) || 16,084 || 17–14 || W2
|- style= background:#cfc
| 32 || May 12 || @ Indians || 1–0 || Santana (6–1) || Tomlin (2–4) || Kintzler (9) || 24,452 || 18–14 || W3
|- style= background:#cfc
| 33 || May 13 || @ Indians || 4–1 || Berríos (1–0) || Clevinger (1–1) || Kintzler (10) || 28,379 || 19–14 || W4
|- style= background:#fbb
| 34 || May 14 || @ Indians || 3–8 ||Bauer (3–4) ||Santiago (4–2)|| — ||23,099||19–15|| L1
|- style= background:#fbb
| 35 || May 16 || Rockies ||3–7||Freeland (4–2) ||Hughes (4–2)||Holland (17) ||24,295||19–16|| L2
|- style= background:#bbb
| — || May 17 || Rockies || colspan="7" |Postponed (rain) (Rescheduled May 18)
|- style= background:#fbb
| 36 || May 18 || Rockies || 1–5 ||Márquez (2–2) ||Santana (6–2)||Holland (18) ||20,603||19–17|| L3
|- style= background:#cfc
| 37 || May 18 || Rockies || 2–0 ||Berríos (2–0)||Chatwood (3–6) || Kintzler (11) ||17,140||20–17|| W1
|- style=  background:#cfc
| 38 || May 19 || Royals ||4–3 (10)||Kintzler (2–0)||Alburquerque (0–1) || — ||23,553||21–17|| W2
|- style= background:#bbb
| — || May 20 || Royals || colspan="7" |Postponed (rain) (Rescheduled May 21)
|- style= background:#fbb
| 39 || May 21 (1) || Royals || 4–6 || Minor (1–1) || Hughes (4–3) || Herrera (9) || n/a || 21–18 || L1
|- style= background:#cfc
| 40 || May 21  (2) || Royals || 8–4 || Mejia (1–1) || Kennedy (0–4) || — || 27,852 || 22–18 || W1 
|- style= background:#cfc
| 41 || May 22 || @ Orioles || 14–7 || Gibson (1–4) || Wilson (2–2) || — || 12,882 || 23–18 || W2
|- style= background:#cfc
| 42 || May 23 || @ Orioles || 2–0 || Santana (7–2) || Bundy (5–3) || — || 13,294 || 24–18 || W3
|- style= background:#cfc
| 43 || May 24 || @ Orioles || 4–3 || Berríos (3–0) || Tillman (1–1) || Kintzler (12) || 32,267 || 25–18 || W4
|- style= background:#fbb
| 44 || May 26 || Rays || 2–5 || Archer (4–3) || Santiago (4–3) || Colomé (13) || 20,949 || 25–19 || L1
|- style= background:#cfc
| 45 || May 27 || Rays || 5–3 || Rogers (2–1) || Farquhar (2–2) || Kintzler (13) || 27,530 || 26–19 || W1
|- style= background:#fbb
| 46 || May 28 || Rays || 6–8 (15) || Colomé (1–2) || Santiago (4–4) || Ramírez (1) || 28,951 || 26–20 || L1
|-style= background:#fbb
| 47 || May 29 || Astros || 8–16 || Jankowski (1–0) || Breslow (0–1) || — || 24,472 || 26–21 || L2
|-style= background:#fbb
| 48 || May 30 || Astros || 2–7 || Fiers (2–2) || Berríos (3–1) || — || 22,616 || 26–22 ||L3
|-style= background:#fbb
| 49 || May 31 || Astros || 6–17 || Feliz (2–0) || Santiago (4–5) || — || 25,593 || 26–23 || L4
|-

|-style= background:#cfc
| 50 || June 1 || @ Angels || 4–2 || Rogers (3–1) || Alvarez (0–2) || — || 33,426 || 27–23 || W1
|-style= background:#cfc
| 51 || June 2 || @ Angels || 11–5 || Gibson (2–4) || Ramírez (5–4) || — || 39,042 || 28–23  || W2
|-style= background:#fbb
| 52 || June 3 || @ Angels || 2–7 || Shoemaker (5–3) || Santana (7–3) || — || 40,236 || 28–24 || L1
|-style= background:#cfc
| 53 || June 4 || @ Angels || 3–2 || Berríos (4–1) || Nolasco (2–6) || Kintzler (15) || 39,701 || 29–24 || W1
|-style= background:#fbb
| 54 || June 6 || @ Mariners || 3–12 || Paxton (5–0) || Santiago (4–6) || — || 18,166 || 29–25 || L1
|-style=background:#fbb
| 55 || June 7 || @ Mariners || 5–6 || Díaz (2–2) || Kintzler (2–1) || — || 15,732 || 29–26 || L2
|-style=background:#cfc 
| 56 || June 8 || @ Mariners || 2–1 || Gibson (3–4) || Bergman (3–3) || Kintzler (16) || 15,621 || 30–26 || W1
|-style=background:#cfc
| 57 || June 9 || @ Giants || 4–0 || Santana (8–3) || Moore (2–7) || — || 41,046 || 31–26 || W2
|-style=background:#cfc
| 58 || June 10 || @ Giants || 3–2 || Berríos (5–1) || Samardzija (2–8) || Kintzler (17) || 41,255 || 32–26 || W3
|-style=background:#fbb
| 59 || June 11 || @ Giants || 8–13 || Osich (1–1) || Belisle (0–1) || — || 41,321 || 32–27 || L1 
|-style=background:#fbb 
| 60 || June 12 || Mariners || 3–14 || Gallardo (3–6) || Mejía (1–2) || — || 16,996 || 32–28 || L2 
|-style=background:#cfc
| 61 || June 13 || Mariners || 20–7 || Gibson (4–4) || Bergman (3–4) || — || 17,922 || 33–28 || W1 
|-style=background:#fbb 
| 62 || June 14 || Mariners || 4–6 || Gaviglio (3–1) || Santana (8–4) || Díaz (11) || 22,283 || 33–29 || L1 
|-style=background:#cfc
| 63 || June 15 || Mariners || 6–2 || Berríos (6–1) || Miranda (6–3) || — || 24,464 || 34–29 || W1 
|-style=background:#fbb
| 64 || June 16 || Indians || 1–8 || Carrasco (7–3) || Turley (0–1) || — || 30,563 || 34–30 || L1 
|-style=background:#fbb
| 65 || June 17 || Indians || 3–9 || McAllister (1–0) || Wilk (0–2) || — || 24,010 || 34–31 || L2 
|-style=background:#fbb
| 66 || June 17 || Indians || 2–6 || Goody (1–0) || Mejía (1–3) || — || 41,017 || 34–32 || L3
|-style=background:#fbb
| 67 || June 18 || Indians || 2–5 || Bauer (6–5) || Gibson (4–5) || Miller (1) || 35,039 || 34–33 || L4 
|-style=background:#cfc 
| 68 || June 20 || White Sox || 9–7 || Santana (9–4) || Holland (5–7) || Kintzler (18) || 26,095 || 35–33 || W1 
|-style=background:#cfc 
| 69 || June 21 || White Sox || 4–2 || Berríos (7–1) || Holmberg (1–1) || Kintzler (19) || 33,316 || 36–33 || W2  
|-style=background:#fbb
| 70 || June 22 || White Sox || 0–9 || Quintana (4–8) || Turley (0–2) || — || 27,684 || 36–34 || L1 
|-style=background:#cfc 
| 71 || June 23 || @ Indians || 5–0 || Mejía (2–3) || Bauer (6–6) || — || 31,725 || 37–34 || W1
|-style=background:#cfc  
| 72 || June 24 || @ Indians || 4–2 || Rogers (4–1) || Allen (0–3) || Kintzler (20) || 33,111 || 38–34 || W2
|-style=background:#cfc  
| 73 || June 25 || @ Indians || 4–0 || Santana (10–4) || Tomlin (4–9) || — || 29,672 || 39–34 || W3
|-style=background:#fbb
| 74 || June 26 || @ Red Sox || 2–4 || Sale (10–3) || Berríos (7–2) || Kimbrel (21) || 37,172 || 39–35 || L1
|-style=background:#fbb 
| 75 || June 27 || @ Red Sox || 2–9 || Pomeranz (7–4) || Santiago (4–7) || — || 36,804 || 39–36 || L2 
|-style=background:#cfc 
| 76 || June 28 || @ Red Sox || 4–1 || Mejia (3–3) || Porcello (4–10) || Kintzler (21) || 37,487 || 40–36 || W1 
|-style=background:#fbb
| 77 || June 29 || @ Red Sox || 3–6 || Price (3–2) || Gibson (4–6) || Kimbrel (22) || 37,445 || 40–37 || L1
|-style=background:#fbb
| 78 || June 30 || @ Royals || 1–8 || Vargas (12–3) || Santana (10–5) || — || 34,332 || 40–38 || L2
|-

|-style=background:#fbb 
| 79 || July 1 (1) || @ Royals || 6–11 || Minor (4–1) || Duffey (0–2) || — || 25,571 || 40–39 || L3
|-style=background:#bfb
| 80 || July 1 (2) || @ Royals || 10–5 || Jorge (1–0) || Hammel (4–7) || — || 32,448 || 41–39 || W1
|-style=background:#fbb  
| 81 || July 2 || @ Royals || 2–6 || Alexander (1–2) || Santiago (4–8) ||—|| 28,775 || 41–40 || L1 
|-style=background:#bfb 
| 82 || July 3 || Angels || 6–2 || Mejía (4–3) || Meyer (3–5) || — || 36,182 || 42–40 || W1
|-style=background:#bfb
| 83 || July 4 || Angels || 5–4 || Gibson (5–6) || Ramirez (7–7) ||Kintzler (22) || 25,013 || 43–40 || W2 
|-style=background:#fbb  
| 84 || July 5 || Angels || 1–2 || Bridwell (3–1) || Santana (10–6) ||Norris (12) || 19,106 || 43–41 || L1  
|-style=background:#bfb
| 85 || July 6 || Orioles || 6–4 || Berríos (8-2) || Bundy (8–8) || Kintzler (23) || 19,706 || 44–41 || W1 
|-style=background:#bfb 
| 86 || July 7 || Orioles || 9–6 || Hildenberger (1–0) || Castro (1–1) || Kintzler (24) || 28,668 || 45–41 || W2
|-style=background:#fbb 
| 87 || July 8 || Orioles || 1–5 || Miley (4–7) || Mejía (4–4) || — || 26,323 || 45–42 || L1
|-style=background:#fbb 
| 88 || July 9 || Orioles || 5–11 ||  Jiménez (4–4) || Gibson (5–7) || — || 25,848 || 45–43 || L2
|- style="text-align:center; background:#bbcaff;"
| colspan="10" | 88th All-Star Game in Miami, Florida
|-style=background:#fbb
| 89 || July 14 || @ Astros || 5–10 || Morton (7–3) || Berríos (8–3) || — || 38,006 || 45–44 || L3
|-style=background:#bfb
| 90 || July 15 || @ Astros || 4–2 || Santana (11–6) || Musgrove (4–8) || Kintzler (25) || 41,038 || 46–44 || W1 
|-style=background:#fbb 
| 91 || July 16 || @ Astros || 2–5 || Fiers (6–4) || Gibson (5–8) || Giles (20) || 38,253 || 46–45 || L1
|-style=background:#bfb
| 92 || July 17 || Yankees || 4–2 || Rogers (5–1) || Smith (0–1) || Kintzler (26) || 27,566 || 47–45 || W1
|-style=background:#fbb 
| 93 || July 18 || Yankees || 3–6 || Shreve (3–1) || Colón (2–9) || Chapman (10) || 33,114 || 47–46 || L1
|-style=background:#bfb 
| 94 || July 19 || Yankees || 6–1 || Berríos (9–3) || Montgomery (6–5) || — || 33,380 || 48–46 || W1 
|-style=background:#fbb 
| 95 || July 21 || Tigers || 3–6 || Sánchez (2–0) || Santana (11–7) || J. Wilson (11) || 22,369 || 48–47 || L1
|-style=background:#bfb 
| 96 || July 22 || Tigers || 6–5 || Gibson (6–8) || Zimmermann (6–8) || Kintzler (27) || 33,700 || 49–47 || W1
|-style=background:#fbb 
| 97 || July 23 || Tigers || 6–9 || Boyd (4–5) || Hildenberger (1–1) || J. Wilson (12) || 28,373 || 49–48 || L1 
|-style=background:#fbb 
| 98 || July 24 || @ Dodgers || 4–6 || Paredes (1–0) || Rogers (5–2) || Jansen (25) || 47,754 || 49–49 || L2 
|-style=background:#fbb
| 99 || July 25 || @ Dodgers || 2–6 || Maeda (9–4) || Berríos (9–4) || Ravin (1) || 44,403 || 49–50 || L3
|-style=background:#fbb
| 100 || July 26 || @ Dodgers || 5–6 || Jansen (5–0) || Kintzler (2–2) || — || 50,941 || 49–51 || L4
|-style=background:#bfb
| 101 || July 28 || @ A's || 6–3 || García (5–7) || Gossett (2–6) || Kintzler (28) || 17,727 || 50–51 || W1
|-style=background:#fbb 
| 102 || July 29 || @ A's || 4–5 || Coulombe (2–1) || Rogers (5–3) || — || 27,047 || 50–52 || L1 
|-style=background:#fbb 
| 103 || July 30 || @ A's || 5–6 || Smith (1–0) || Duffey (0–3) || — || 16,790 || 50–53 || L2 
|-

|-style=background:#fbb 
| 104 || August 1 || @ Padres || 0–3 || Chacín (11–7) || Berríos (9–5) || Hand (7) || 24,491 || 50–54 || L3 
|-style=background:#bfb 
| 105 || August 2 || @ Padres || 5–2 || Santana (12–7) || Perdomo (5–6) || — || 23,806 || 51–54 || W1 
|-style=background:#fbb 
| 106 || August 3 || Rangers || 1–4 || Griffin (5–2) || Mejía (4–5) || Claudio (5) || 22,903 || 51–55 || L1 
|-style=background:#bfb 
| 107 || August 4 || Rangers || 8–4 || Colón (3–9) || Perez (5–10) || — || 22,272 || 52–55 || W1
|-style=background:#fbb
| 108 || August 5 || Rangers || 1–4 || Hamels (6–1) || Gibson (6–9) || — || 27,415 || 52–56 || L1
|-style=background:#bfb 
| 109 || August 6 || Rangers || 6–5 || Berríos (10–5) || Bibens-Dirkx (3–2) || Belisle (1) || 29,056 || 53–56 || W1
|-style=background:#bfb 
| 110 || August 7 || Brewers || 5–4 || Boshers (1–0) || Drake (3–4) || Belisle (2) || 31,339 || 54–56 || W2
|-style=background:#bfb
| 111 || August 8 || Brewers || 11–4 || Duffey (1–3) || Garza (5–6) || Gee (1) || 34,185 || 55–56 || W3
|-style=background:#bfb 
| 112 || August 9 || @ Brewers || 4–0 || Colón (4–9) || Woodruff (1–1) || — || 30,174 || 56–56 || W4 
|-style=background:#bfb 
| 113 || August 10 || @ Brewers || 7–2 || Busenitz (1–0) || Davies (13–6) || — || 33,904 || 57–56 || W5 
|-style=background:#bfb
| 114 || August 11 || @ Tigers || 9–4 || Pressly (2–2) || Sánchez (3–3) || — || 29,733 || 58–56 || W6
|-style=background:#fbb 
| 115 || August 12 || @ Tigers || 11–12 || Greene (3–2) || Belisle (0–2) || — || 33,006 || 58–57 || L1
|-style=background:#bfb 
| 116 || August 13 || @ Tigers || 6–4 || Duffey (2–3) ||  Rondón (1–3) || Hildenberger (1) || 30,582 || 59–57 || W1
|-style=background:#fbb
| 117 || August 15 || Indians || 1–8 || Salazar (5–5)  || Colón (2–2)  || — || 29,626 || 59–58 || L1 
|-style=background:#bbb
| — || August 16 || Indians || colspan="7" |Postponed (rain) (Resceduled for August 17)
|-style=background:#fbb 
| 118 || August 17 || Indians || 3–9 || Carrasco (12–5) || Gibson (6–10) || — || 29,579 || 59–59 || L2
|-style=background:#bfb 
| 119 || August 17 || Indians || 4–2 || Hildenberger (2–1) || Clevinger (6–5) || Belisle (3) || 22,857 || 60–59 || W1 
|-style=background:#bfb 
| 120 || August 18 || D-backs || 10–3 || Santana (13–7) || Godley (6–7) || — || 25,830 || 61–59 || W2
|-style=background:#bfb 
| 121 || August 19 || D-backs || 5–0 || Berríos (11–5) || Greinke (14–6) || — || 29,456 || 62–59 || W3 
|-style=background:#bfb 
| 122 || August 20 ||D-backs || 12–5 || Colón (5–10) || McFarland (4–5) || — || 27,367 || 63–59 || W4
|-style=background:#fbb 
| 123 || August 21 || @ White Sox || 6–7 || Rodon (2–4) || Melville (0–1) || Minaya (3) ||  || 63–60 || L1
|-style=background:#bfb 
| 124 || August 21 || @ White Sox || 10–2 || Gee (1–0) || Fulmer (0–1) || Duffey (1) || 14,493 || 64–60 || W1
|-style=background:#bfb 
| 125 || August 22 || @ White Sox || 4–1 || Gibson (7–10) || Giolito (0–1) || Belisle (4) || 14,053 || 65–60 || W2
|-style=background:#fbb
| 126 || August 23 || @ White Sox || 3–4 || Farquhar (3–2) || Hildenberger (2–2) || — || 15,605 || 65–61 || L1 
|-style=background:#fbb 
| 127 || August 24 || @ White Sox || 1–5 || Holland (7–13) || Berríos (11–6) || — || 34,032 || 65–62 || L2
|-style=background:#bfb
| 128 || August 25 || @ Blue Jays || 6–1 || Colón (6–10) || Happ (6–10)  || — || 37,525 || 66–62 || W1
|-style=background:#fbb 
| 129 || August 26 || @ Blue Jays || 9–10 || Estrada (6–8) || Gee (1–1) || Osuna (34) || 45,591 || 66–63 || L1
|-style=background:#bfb 
| 130 || August 27 || @ Blue Jays || 7–2 || Gibson (8–10) || Biagini (3–9) || — || 42,478 || 67–63 || W1
|-style=background:#bfb
| 131 || August 29 || White Sox || 6–4 || Santana (14–7) || Shields (2–5) || Belisle (5) || 20,530 || 68–63 || W2
|-style=background:#bfb 
| 132 || August 30 || White Sox || 11–1 || Berríos (12–6) || Holland (7–14) || — || 21,172 || 69–63 || W3
|-style=background:#bfb 
| 133 || August 31 || White Sox || 5–4 || Belisle (1–2) || Minaya (2–2) || — || 21,288 || 70–63 || W4 
|-

|-style=background:#fbb 
| 134 || September 1 || Royals || 6–7 || Hammel (7–10) || Gee (1–2) || Alexander (2) || 24,068 || 70–64 || L1
|-style=background:#bfb 
| 135 || September 2 || Royals || 17–0 || Gibson (9–10) || Garcia (0–1) || — || 33,413 || 71–64 || W1 
|-style=background:#fbb 
| 136 || September 3 || Royals|| 4–5 || Alexander (4–3) || Busenitz (1–1) || Maurer (21) || 32,234 || 71–65 || L1
|-style=background:#fbb 
| 137 || September 4 || @ Rays || 4–11 || Cobb (10–9) || Berríos (12–7) || — || 12,108 || 71–66 || L2
|-style=background:#fbb 
| 138 || September 5 || @ Rays || 1–2 || Odorizzi (8–7) || Colón (6–11)  || Colomé (42) || 6,509 || 71–67 || L3
|-style=background:#bfb 
| 139 || September 6 || @ Rays || 10–6 || Rogers (6–3) || Cishek (3–2) || — || 7,185 || 72–67 || W1 
|-style=background:#bfb  
| 140 || September 7 || @ Royals || 4–2 || Hildenberger (3–2) || Herrera (3–3) || Belisle (6) || 26,485 || 73–67 || W2
|-style=background:#bfb 
| 141 || September 8 || @ Royals || 8–5 || Santana (8–5) || Kennedy (4–11) || Belisle (7) || 31,879 || 74–67 || W3 
|-style=background:#fbb 
| 142 || September 9 || @ Royals || 2–5 || Minor (6–6) || Pressly (2–3) || Maurer (2) || 29,991 || 74–68 || L1 
|-style=background:#fbb 
| 143 || September 10 || @ Royals || 3–11 || Vargas (15–10) || Colón (6–12) || — || 35,003 || 74–69 || L2
|-style=background:#bfb  
| 144 || September 12 || Padres || 16–0 || Gibson (10–10) || Wood (3–6) || — || 28,852 || 75–69 || W1 
|-style=background:#bfb 
| 145 || September 13 || Padres || 3–1 (10) || Belisle (2–2) || Maton (3–1) || — || 20,018 || 76–69 || W2 
|-style=background:#bfb 
| 146 || September 14 || Blue Jays || 3–2 (10) || Gee (2–2) || Santos (0–1) || — || 22,664 || 77–69 || W3
|-style=background:#fbb 
| 147 || September 15 || Blue Jays || 3–4 || Happ (9–10) || Colón (6–13) || Osuna (36) || 27,902 || 77–70 || L1
|-style=background:#fbb 
| 148 || September 16 || Blue Jays || 2–7 || Estrada (9–8) || Mejía (4–6) || — || 29,917 || 77–71 || L2 
|-style=background:#bfb 
| 149 || September 17 || Blue Jays || 13–7 || Gibson (11–10) || Biagini (3–11) || — || 27,572 || 78–71 || W1
|-style=background:#fbb 
| 150 || September 18 || @ Yankees || 1–2 || Robertson (9–2) || Santana (15–8) || Chapman (19) || 30,425 || 78–72 || L1 
|-style=background:#fbb 
| 151 || September 19 || @ Yankees || 2–5 || Sabathia (12–5) || Berríos (12–8) || Chapman (20) || 30,218 || 78–73 || L2 
|-style=background:#fbb  
| 152 || September 20 || @ Yankees || 3–11 || Shreve (4–1) || Colón (6–14) || — || 30,099 || 78–74 || L3 
|-style=background:#bfb   
| 153 || September 21 || @ Tigers || 12–1 || Gee (3–2) || Zimmerman (8–13) || — || 25,437 || 79–74 || W1 
|-style=background:#bfb 
| 154 || September 22 || @ Tigers || 7–3 || Gibson (12–10) || Norris (4–8) || — || 25,390 || 80–74 || W2
|-style=background:#bfb 
| 155 || September 23 || @ Tigers || 10–4 || Santana (16–8) || Stumpf (0–1) || — || 26,800 || 81–74 || W3 
|-style= background:#bfb
| 156 || September 24 || @ Tigers || 10–4 || Berríos (13–8) || Farmer (4–5) || — || 23,882 || 82–74 || W4 
|-style= background:#bfb
| 157 || September 26 || @ Indians || 8–6 || Rogers (7–3) || Shaw (4–6) || Belisle (8) || 21,268 || 83–74 || W5
|-style=background:#fbb
| 158 || September 27 || @ Indians || 2–4 || Clevinger (12–5) || Mejia (4–7) || — || 19,682 || 83–75 || L1 
|-style=background:#fbb
| 159 || September 28 || @ Indians || 2–5 || Carrasco (18–6) || Hildenberger (3–3) || — || 21,810 || 83–76 || L2   
|-style=background:#bfb
| 160|| September 29 || Tigers || 6–3 || Berríos (14–8) || Boyd (6–11) || Belisle (9) || 34,580 || 84–76 || W1 
|-style=background:#fbb 
| 161 || September 30 || Tigers || 2–3 || Farmer (5–5) || Slegers (0–1) || Greene (9) || 35,515 || 84–77 || L1 
|-style=background:#bfb
| 162 || October 1 || Tigers || 5–1 || Colón (7–14) || Sánchez (3–7) || Moya (1) || 28,148 || 85–77 || W1 
|-

|-
| Legend:       = Win       = Loss       = PostponementBold = Twins team member

Roster

Postseason

Game log

|- style=background:#fbb 
| 1 || October 3 || @ Yankees	|| 4–8 || Robertson (1–0) || Berríos (0–1) || — || 49,280 || 0–1
|-

Postseason rosters

| style="text-align:left" |
Pitchers: 9 Matt Belisle 17 José Berríos 35 Dillon Gee 39 Trevor Hildenberger 49 Adalberto Mejía 54 Ervin Santana 55 Taylor Rogers 56 Tyler Duffey 57 Ryan Pressly 62 Buddy Boshers 67 Alan Busenitz 
Catchers: 21 Jason Castro 38 Chris Gimenez 43 Mitch Garver 
Infielders: 2 Brian Dozier 5 Eduardo Escobar 7 Joe Mauer 11 Jorge Polanco 16 Ehire Adrianza 19 Kennys Vargas 
Outfielders: 8 Zack Granite 20 Eddie Rosario 25 Byron Buxton 26 Max Kepler 36 Robbie Grossman 
|- valign="top"

Farm system

References

External links
2017 Minnesota Twins season at Baseball Reference

2017
2017 Major League Baseball season
2017 in sports in Minnesota